Babīte Parish is an administrative unit of Mārupe Municipality, Latvia. From 2009 until 2021, it was part of the former Babīte Municipality. Latvian law defines Babīte Parish as belonging partly to the region of Vidzeme and partly to Semigallia.

References

Parishes of Latvia
Mārupe Municipality
Vidzeme
Semigallia